The Democratic Alternative (abbr. ДА, DA) was a political party in Serbia. It was founded in July 1997 by secession of certain members from the ruling Socialist Party of Serbia (SPS), most notably Nebojša Čović who served as the party's president during its entire existence. It later merged into the Social Democratic Party (SDP), whom its leadership took over.

Democratic Alternative was part of the 2000-2003 Democratic Opposition of Serbia (DOS), which ran on the December 2000 parliamentary elections. It received 6 seats of the 176 won by the Democratic Opposition. Nebojša Čović became the interim Deputy Prime Minister on October 24, 2000. On 25 January 2001 the new government was elected in which he served as Deputy Prime Minister until 18 March 2004. For a short time from 12 March 2003 to 17 March 2003 Čović was the acting Premier in the wake of the assassination of Prime Minister Zoran Djindjic.

At the December 2003 parliamentary election, the party won 84,463 votes or 2.2% of the popular vote thus failed to pass the electoral threshold.

Electoral results

Parliamentary elections

1997 establishments in Serbia
2004 disestablishments in Serbia
Defunct political parties in Serbia
Political parties disestablished in 2004
Political parties established in 1997